Gary Merritt Charles Coalter (born July 8, 1950) is a Canadian former professional ice hockey forward who played 34 games in the National Hockey League for the Kansas City Scouts and California Golden Seals between 1973 and 1975. The rest of his career, which lasted from 1967 to 1979, was spent in various minor leagues.

Career statistics

Regular season and playoffs

External links
 

1950 births
Living people
Baltimore Clippers players
California Golden Seals players
Canadian ice hockey forwards
Hamilton Red Wings (OHA) players
Kansas City Scouts players
Maine Nordiques players
New York Rangers draft picks
Omaha Knights (CHL) players
Philadelphia Firebirds (AHL) players
Providence Reds players
Salt Lake Golden Eagles (WHL) players
Ice hockey people from Toronto
Springfield Indians players